Nancy-Ville station (French: Gare de Nancy-Ville) is the main railway station serving the city Nancy, Meurthe-et-Moselle department, northeastern France. It is situated on the Paris–Strasbourg railway.

Services

The station is served by high speed trains to Paris and Strasbourg, and by regional trains towards Paris, Épinal, Metz, Strasbourg and Dijon.

A shuttle bus service serves the connection between Lorraine TGV station and the regional airport.

References

External links
 
Rechercher une fiche horaire, TER Grand Est 

Railway stations in Grand Est
Buildings and structures in Nancy, France
Railway stations in France opened in 1850
Buildings and structures completed in 1856
Transport in Nancy, France
19th-century architecture in France